Portigliola is a comune (municipality) in the Province of Reggio Calabria in the Italian region Calabria, located about  southwest of Catanzaro and about  northeast of Reggio Calabria.

Portigliola borders the following municipalities: Antonimina, Locri, Sant'Ilario dello Ionio.

Demographic evolution

References

Cities and towns in Calabria